Lucilia eximia is a species of blow fly in the family Calliphoridae.

References

Further reading

External links

 
 

Calliphoridae
Insects described in 1819